is a railway station in the city of Iwaki, Fukushima Prefecture, Japan, operated by East Japan Railway Company (JR East).

Lines

Station layout
The station has one side platform serving a single bi-directional track. The station is unattended.

History
Eda Station opened on October 10, 1948. The station was absorbed into the JR East network upon the privatization of Japanese National Railways (JNR) on April 1, 1987.

Surrounding area
The station is located in an isolated, rural area, with a few houses nearby.

See also
 List of railway stations in Japan

References

External links
 
  

Stations of East Japan Railway Company
Railway stations in Fukushima Prefecture
Ban'etsu East Line
Railway stations in Japan opened in 1948
Iwaki, Fukushima